Stårheim Idrettslag is a Norwegian sports club from Stårheim, Sogn og Fjordane. It has sections for association football, handball, track and field, cross-country skiing, ski jumping, and biathlon.

The club was founded in 1935. World Cup biathlete Ronny Hafsås represents the club, so does the ski jumper Akseli Kokkonen.

References

Official site 

Football clubs in Norway
Sports clubs established in 1935
Sport in Sogn og Fjordane
Ski jumping clubs in Norway
1935 establishments in Norway